The Karrayyu (also Kaariye, Karrayyuu) are Karanle_somali  clan inhabiting the Awash Valley banks of Abadir and Merti area in central Ethiopia. They are pastoralists. Karrayyu neighbor the Afar and Argobba people. It is believed the extinct Harla ethnicity were incorporated into Karrayyu Karanle.

Overview 
The Karrayyu are known to have migrated to Metehara the capital of the Harla Kingdom.

The Karrayyu inhabit the Afar Region, Oromia, Somali Region.

See also 
 List of Oromo subgroups and clans

References 

Ethnic groups in Ethiopia
Oromo groups
 
Cushitic-speaking peoples